Martin Schechter may refer to:
 Martin Schechter (epidemiologist)
 Martin Schechter (mathematician)